Apoglossum ruscifolium  is a small red marine seaweed.

Description
Apoglossum ruscifolium has branched monostromic blades growing to 10 cm long. The axis branches with primary blades reaching 10 cm long and up to 0.8 cm wide, each with a clear midrib and pointed apices. Lateral veins are microscopic. The species is similar to Membranoptera alata and Hypoglossum hypoglossoides but can be clearly distinguished. The branches of H. hypoglossoides are clearly pointed and the young blades of M.alata are not pointed and are asymmetric with pincer-like tips.

Reproduction
Microscopic sori are formed are microscopic and are formed on either side of the midrib. Female  cystocarps occur singly on the frond.

Distribution
Recorded all around Great Britain and Ireland including Shetland, the Isle of Man and the Channel Islands. Norway to the Mediterranean, the South Atlantic and Indian Oceans.

References

Delesseriaceae